Phạm Thị Hiền (born 19 August 1984) is a Vietnamese rower. She competed in the women's lightweight double sculls event at the 2004 Summer Olympics.

References

External links
 

1984 births
Living people
Vietnamese female rowers
Olympic rowers of Vietnam
Rowers at the 2004 Summer Olympics
People from Thanh Hóa province
21st-century Vietnamese women